Lefeuvre is a French surname. Notable people with the surname include:

Ian LeFeuvre, Canadian musician
Louis-Albert Lefeuvre (1845–1924), French sculptor
René Lefeuvre (1902–1988), French Luxemburgist

See also
LeFeuvre Scarp, elevation in Antarctica
Ordish–Lefeuvre system of cable-stayed bridge design

French-language surnames